Dimitrios Deligiannis (born 1873, date of death unknown) was a Greek runner.  He competed at the 1896 Summer Olympics in Athens. He was born in Stemnitsa, Gortynia.

Deligiannis was one of 17 athletes to start the marathon race.  He finished sixth of the nine athletes to have completed the race.

References

External links

1873 births
Year of death missing
Greek male long-distance runners
Greek male marathon runners
Olympic athletes of Greece
Athletes (track and field) at the 1896 Summer Olympics
19th-century sportsmen
People from Arcadia, Peloponnese
Place of death missing
Sportspeople from the Peloponnese